The Finn Men's Competition was a sailing event on the Sailing at the 1992 Summer Olympics program in Barcelona. Seven races were scheduled. 29 sailors, on 29 boats, from 29 nations competed.

Results

Daily standings

Notes

References 
 
 
 
 
 

 

Finn
Finn competitions
Men's events at the 1992 Summer Olympics